Bellis cordifolia is a species of daisy in the genus Bellis. It is endemic to Spain.

References

cordifolia
Flora of Spain